Baseball was contested by four teams Chinese Taipei, Japan, South Korea and China as a demonstration sport at the 1990 Asian Games in Fengtai Softball Field, Beijing, China from 3 October to 5 October 1990.

Chinese Taipei won the competition with a 2–1 record. South Korea and Japan finished second and third with the same record, the host nation China finished last without winning a match.

Medalists

Results

References
 New Straits Times, October 9–15, 1990

External links
 www.ocasia.org

 
1990 Asian Games events
1990
Asian Games
1990 Asian Games
Baseball in Beijing